Zaragoza Museum (Spanish - Museo de Zaragoza) is a national museum in the Plaza de los Sitios in the city of Zaragoza in Spain. Its collections range from the Lower Palaeolithic to the modern era and include archaeology, fine arts, ethnology and Iberian ceramics.

It is the city's oldest museum and its main building - housing the fine arts and archaeology display - is the Neo-Renaissance structure designed for the Spanish-French Exhibition of 1908 by Ricardo Magdalena and Julio Bravo. Its design was inspired by the Patio de la Infanta, home of the Renaissance merchant and patron Gabriel Zaporta. The museum also has an ethnology display at the Casa Pirenaica, a ceramics display at the Casa de Albarracín in the Parque José Antonio Labordeta and the remains of Colonia Celsa in Velilla de Ebro.

Gallery

External links
 Museo de Zaragoza
 Museo de Zaragoza @ Patrimonio Cultural de Aragón
 Paintings by Goya in the Museo de Zaragoza
 Guide to the Museo de Zaragoza
Virtual tour of the Zaragoza Museum provided by Google Arts & Culture

Buildings and structures in Zaragoza
Museums in Zaragoza
Ethnographic museums in Spain
History museums in Spain
National museums of Spain
Art museums and galleries in Spain